The Synod of Brixen was a church council held on 15 June 1080 in the episcopal city of Brixen. It was convoked by King Henry IV of Germany at the height of the Investiture Controversy to pass judgement on Pope Gregory VII. The synod issued a decree condemning the pope, demanding his abdication and authorizing his deposition if he refused. The synod also elected his successor, Wibert of Ravenna.

Henry IV was at war with a rival claimant to the kingship, Rudolf of Rheinfelden. At the time of the synod, Rudolf had won a recent victory at the battle of Flarchheim on 27 January 1080. In the aftermath of the battle, Henry sent Archbishop Liemar of Bremen and Bishop Rupert of Bamberg to Rome to confer with Gregory at his annual Lenten synod. Rudolf too sent envoys to Rome. On 7 March, the synod chose to recognize Rudolf as the legitimate king. On 13 April, Gregory VII pronounced Henry excommunicated and gave him until 1 August to repent, else "he would die or be deposed". In response Henry convoked the synod of Mainz that met on 31 May. It recommended removing the pope and electing another.

The main source for the synod of Brixen that followed is the synodal decree, which states that "a meeting of thirty [prelates] and of secular princes not only of Italy but also of Germany was assembled by royal command". The assembled prelates included 29 bishops from the Holy Roman Empire and one priest, Hugh Candidus, representing the College of Cardinals. All the kingdoms of the empire were represented. There were twenty bishops from Italy, eight from Germany and one from Burgundy. Henry IV was also present at Brixen with an armed force of Germans and Italians. The precedent for the king calling a council was to be found in the synod of Sutri that Henry's father, Henry III, had held in 1046.

The choice of Brixen (Bressanone) was based on the loyalty of its bishop, Altwin, to Henry IV's cause, as well as its geographical location. It lay south of the Brenner Pass in the extreme south of the Kingdom of Germany and was easily accessible to the Italians. Henry IV arrived at Brixen directly from the synod of Mainz. Most of the bishops who had convened in Mainz sent letters or envoys to Brixen to join in the condemnation of the pope.

As he had at the synod of Worms in 1076, Hugh Candidus gave evidence at Brixen concerning Gregory VII's misdeeds. He accused him of using any means necessary to obtain the papacy, including simony, violence, heresy, necromancy and murder. He was specifically accused of poisoning his four predecessors. He had usurped his archidiaconate at Rome. He attended obscene shows. The latest crime was that of the Lenten synod, in which he had approved of the death of the king and lent support to a traitor, Rudolf. Although the most scurrilous accusations are rejected by modern scholarship, not all of the accusations contained in the synodal decree was a fabrication for propaganda purposes. The accusations regarding Gregory's actions at Lent were both serious and true.

The synodal decree has some of the character of a minutes, since it provides a chronological outline of the synod. The final sentence on Gregory was that he "should be canonically deposed and expelled and condemned in perpetuity, if, having heard this [decree], he does not step down." All the prelates attending but two signed the decree. Henry IV signed the decree after the bishops.

Signatories

Hugh Candidus, cardinal-priest of San Clemente al Laterano
Tedald of Milan
Cono of Brescia
Otto of Tortona
William of Pavia
Reginald of Belluno
Sigebod of Verona
Denis of Piacenza
Udo of Asti
Hugh of Fermo
Milo of Padua
Conrad of Utrecht
Henry of Aquileia
Didald of Vicenza
Regenger of Vercelli
Rupert of Bamberg
Norbert of Chur
Everard of Parma
Roland of Treviso
Arnulf of Cremona
Arnulf of Bergamo
Tiedo of Brandenburg
Liemar of Bremen
Werner of Bobbio
Altwin of Brixen
Meginward of Freising
Burchard of Lausanne
Conrad of Genoa
Henry IV of Germany

Archbishop Wibert of Ravenna and Bishop Benno of Osnabrück attended but did not subscribe the decree.

Notes

Sources

1080 in Europe
1080s in the Holy Roman Empire
11th-century Catholic Church councils
Investiture Controversy
Henry IV, Holy Roman Emperor
Pope Gregory VII